Innocent is a British anthology television series, produced by TXTV productions, that was first broadcast on ITV for four consecutive nights between 14 and 17 May 2018. The first series stars Lee Ingleby as David Collins, Daniel Ryan as Phil Collins, David's faithful brother, Hermione Norris as Alice Moffatt and Adrian Rawlins as her husband, Rob Moffatt. The German TV broadcaster ARD produced a two-part adaptation, first broadcast in December 2019. The second series, aired in 2021, starred Katherine Kelly, Andrew Tiernan, Priyanga Burford and Jamie Bamber.

Plot

Series 1
This series tells the story of David Collins (Lee Ingleby), who was convicted of murdering his wife Tara. After serving seven years in prison he was acquitted on a legal technicality. The story revolves around attempts to reveal the truth of who actually killed Tara, with the plot involving the police, Tara's sister Alice (Hermione Norris), who now has custody of Tara and David's children, and David's brother Phil (Daniel Ryan).

Series 2
Matthew Taylor, a 16-year-old school boy was brutally murdered in the quiet Lake District. Five years later the accused is found not guilty and released from prison.

Cast

Series 1

Series 2

Episodes

Series 1 (2018)

Series 2 (2021)

References

External links
 
 

2018 British television series debuts
2010s British drama television series
2010s British mystery television series
2020s British drama television series
2020s British mystery television series
ITV television dramas
English-language television shows
Murder in television
Television series by All3Media
Television series about dysfunctional families
Television shows set in the United Kingdom